Tong is a village and civil parish in Shropshire, also bordering Staffordshire in England. It is located between the towns of Shifnal, Newport and Brewood. It is near junction 3 of the M54 motorway and A41 road. The population of the village which was included in the civil parish at the 2011 census was 243. The village is also near to Weston Park and the village of Weston-under-Lizard.

Etymology
The name of the village derives from the Old English Tweonga, which means a pinched piece or spit of land; cf. tongs. This stems from the fact that Tong sits between two tributaries of the infant River Worfe.

History
In the 1840s, Tong was surveyed by two different railway companies. The Shrewsbury and Wolverhampton Railway was eventually driven further south to run through Ruckley and Neachley (just south of the M54), whilst the Shrewsbury and Leicester Direct Railway, which would have gone in a north-east to south-west direction between Tong and Tong Norton, was never built.

The village lies just to the north of the M54 in Shropshire. The A41 road used to run through the village, but after heavy traffic and the death of a child under a lorry, the village was bypassed in 1963.

Escape of Charles II
In "White-ladies," one of the "Boscobel Tracts" that describe the events of the escape of Charles II from England after the Battle of Worcester (3 September 1651), there is a statement that Charles, while sheltering at Boscobel House about two miles away, "had the pleasure of a prospect from Tong to Breewood (sic), which satisfied the eyes, and of the famous bells at Tong, which entertained the ear." The bells he heard were the bells of St. Bartholomew's. During the escape Charles also spent the night of 4/5 September 1651 at Hobbal Grange in the parish of Tong as a guest of Richard Penderel.

Church

The village is remarkable mainly for its church, St Bartholomews, outside of which is the supposed grave of Little Nell, a fictional character in Charles Dickens's book, The Old Curiosity Shop. It is thought that Dickens visited Tong church. His grandmother is supposed to have worked at Tong Castle many years before as a girl. The Castle (demolished in 1954) stood to the south; its site is now occupied by the M54 motorway.

The 'grave' is thought to have come about because Charles Dickens's novel was serialised and shipped over to America, and as a result, Americans began coming over to England to visit scenes featured in the book. The tourists recognised the references to Tong church from the book and came to view the supposed 'grave', which of course was not there.

However, a verger and village postmaster, George H. Boden (16 August 1856 - May 1943) apparently asked local people to pay for a headstone, forged an entry in the church register of burials (apparently the giveaway was that he used post office ink to do this), and charged people to see the 'grave'. The marker has been moved from time to time to make way for genuine graves.

A particularly notable feature of  St. Bartholomew's is the collection of memorials to the Vernon family and other proprietors of the Tong estate inside the church. St. Bartholomew's was chosen by Simon Jenkins of The Times in 1999 as one of the best 1,000 churches (out of 15,000) in England. He awarded the church, which was mostly rebuilt in 1409, three stars out of a possible five. He refers to the collection of village tombs, the masterpiece of which being that of Richard Vernon, who died in 1451. Most of the earlier ones are carved from alabaster, and are the products of the top end of the nearby late medieval Nottingham alabaster industry.

Gallery

Tong Castle 

Tong Castle was a large mostly Gothic country house, set within a park landscaped by Capability Brown, on the site of a medieval castle of the same name. Tong Castle's remains are now a Historic England Grade II listed site.

Potential New Town Development
Since 2018, Bradford Estates, who own land around Tong and surrounding villages in the area, have been promoting a new settlement proposal to Shropshire Council to build an employment park creating 9,000 jobs, up to 3,000 homes with a village centre, medical facility, school and four public parks on land on west side of the A41 bounded by the M54, A5 and Lizard hill. Some local residents formed an action group to stop the plans, including a local MP. The proposal was eventually rejected in 2020 by Shropshire Council, but Bradford Estates are still continuing with the proposal in light of the need regionally for jobs and homes; later that year, a fresh consultation on the plans was renewed and is still ongoing.

See also
Listed buildings in Tong, Shropshire

References

External links

Villages in Shropshire
Civil parishes in Shropshire